Rosario Tijeras is a Colombian telenovela produced by Ángela Pulido Serrano for RCN Televisión. It is based on the book of the same name written by Jorge Franco. The series originally aired from February 8, 2010 to July 28, 2010. It stars María Fernanda Yépez as the titular character.

It tells the story of Rosario, a beautiful but dangerous woman who lived a childhood marked by pain and abuse. This triggered a thirst for violence and vengeance in her.

Plot 
The series tells the story of the legendary and less off leader with scissors (hence her name), who has a stormy love with a pair of inseparable friends from wealthy families: Antonio de Bedout (Andrés Sandoval) and Emilio Echegaray (Sebastián Martínez).

Their lives so distant will unite when faced with the beautiful Rosario, who takes them to a world full of danger and ferocity, where she is both a victim and an instrument of death.

Cast

Main 
 María Fernanda Yépez as Maria del Rosario
 Sebastián Martínez as Emilio Echegaray
 Andrés Sandoval as Antonio de Bedut
 Luis Carlos Fuquen as Francisco
 Juan David Restrepo as Johnefe
 Julián Mora as Ferney
 Adriana Arango as Rubí
 Margarita Ortega as Martha Lucia Betancourt
 Luis Fernando Hoyos as Luis Eduardo Betancourt
 Natalia Jeréz as Paula Restrepo
 Victoria Góngora as Susana
 Laura Perico as Leticia Betancourt

Recurring 
 Emerson Rodríguez as Jota
 Andrés Felipe Torres as "El Tigre"
 Valentina Gómez as Yolima
 Juan Felipe Barrientos as Klaus
 Estefanía Borge as Samantha 
 Yuri Vargas as Zulai
 Orlando Miguel as Mr. Robinson
 Ana María Kámper as Ana de Echegray

Remake 

A Mexican remake, Rosario Tijeras, premiered on October 30, 2016 on TV Azteca, starring Bárbara de Regil and José María de Tavira.

References

External links 
 

Sony Pictures Television telenovelas
2010 telenovelas
RCN Televisión telenovelas
Colombian telenovelas
Spanish-language telenovelas
2010 Colombian television series debuts
2010 Colombian television series endings
Television series by Teleset
Television shows set in Colombia
Television shows remade overseas